This is a list of members of the King's Privy Council for Canada appointed from 1911 to 1948.

Ministry

Borden

The Right Honourable Sir Robert Laird Borden (from October 10, 1911)
The Right Honourable Sir George Halsey Perley (from October 10, 1911)
The Honourable Robert Rogers (from October 10, 1911)
The Honourable Frederick Debartzch Monk (from October 10, 1911)
The Honourable Francis Cochrane (from October 10, 1911)
The Right Honourable Sir William Thomas White (from October 10, 1911)
The Honourable Louis Philippe Pelletier (from October 10, 1911)
The Honourable Sir John Douglas Hazen (from October 10, 1911)
The Right Honourable Charles Joseph Doherty (from October 10, 1911)
The Honourable Sir Samuel Hughes (from October 10, 1911)
The Honourable William James Roche (from October 10, 1911)
The Honourable Thomas Wilson Crothers (from October 10, 1911)
The Honourable Wilfrid Bruno Nantel (from October 10, 1911)
The Honourable John Dowsley Reid (from October 10, 1911)
The Honourable Sir Albert Edward Kemp (from October 10, 1911)
The Honourable Sir James Alexander Lougheed (from October 10, 1911)
The Honourable Martin Burrell (from October 16, 1911)
The Honourable James Kirkpatrick Kerr (from October 18, 1911)
The Honourable Charles Marcil (from February 15, 1912)
The Honourable Louis Coderre (from October 19, 1912)
The Honourable Samuel Barker (from February 28, 1913)
The Honourable George Adam Clare (from April 1, 1913)
The Honourable Thomas Chase-Casgrain (from October 20, 1914)
The Honourable Pierre Edouard Blondin (from October 20, 1914)
The Right Honourable Arthur Meighen (from October 2, 1915)
The Honourable Esioff Léon Patenaude (from October 6, 1915)
The Right Honourable William Morris Hughes (from February 18, 1916)
The Honourable Albert Sévigny (from January 8, 1917)
The Honourable Charles Colquhoun Ballantyne (from October 3, 1917)

Union government

The Right Honourable Arthur Sifton (from October 12, 1917)
The Honourable James Alexander Calder (from October 12, 1917)
The Honourable Newton Rowell (from October 12, 1917)
The Honourable Sydney Chilton Mewburn (from October 12, 1917)
The Honourable Thomas Alexander Crerar (from October 12, 1917)
The Honourable Frank Broadstreet Carvell (from October 13, 1917)
The Honourable Alexander Kenneth Maclean (from October 23, 1917)
The Honourable Gideon Decker Robertson (from October 23, 1917)
The Honourable Sir Hormidas Laporte (from November 13, 1917)
The Honourable Hugh Guthrie (from July 5, 1919)
The Honourable Sir Henry Lumley Drayton (from August 2, 1919)
The Honourable Simon Fraser Tolmie (from August 12, 1919)

Meighen

The Honourable Fleming Blanchard McCurdy (from July 13, 1920)
The Honourable Edgar Keith Spinney (from July 13, 1920)
The Honourable Rupert Wilson Wigmore (from July 13, 1920)
The Honourable Joseph Bolduc (from February 22, 1921)
The Honourable Edgar Nelson Rhodes (from February 22, 1921)
The Honourable William Smith (from May 4, 1921)
The Honourable William Andrew Charlton (from May 28, 1921)
The Honourable Louis-de-Gonzague Belley (from September 21, 1921)
The Honourable John Babington Macaulay Baxter (from September 21, 1921)
The Honourable John Wesley Edwards (from September 21, 1921)
The Honourable Louis Phillippe Normand (from September 21, 1921)
The Honourable Henry Herbert Stevens (from September 21, 1921)
The Honourable Rodolphe Monty (from September 21, 1921)
The Honourable John Alexander Stewart (from September 21, 1921)
The Honourable Edmund James Bristol (from September 21, 1921)
The Honourable Robert James Manion (from September 22, 1921)
The Honourable James Robert Wilson (from September 26, 1921)
The Right Honourable Richard Bedford Bennett (from October 4, 1921)

King

The Honourable Hewitt Bostock (from December 29, 1921)
The Honourable Sir Jean Lomer Gouin (from December 29, 1921)
The Honourable Charles Stewart (from December 29, 1921)
The Honourable Jacques Bureau (from December 29, 1921)
The Right Honourable Ernest Lapointe (from December 29, 1921)
The Honourable Daniel Duncan McKenzie (from December 29, 1921)
The Honourable James Alexander Robb (from December 29, 1921)
The Honourable Thomas Andrew Low (from December 29, 1921)
The Honourable Arthur Bliss Copp (from December 29, 1921)
The Honourable William Costello Kennedy (from December 29, 1921)
The Honourable William Richard Motherwell (from December 29, 1921)
The Honourable James Murdock (from December 29, 1921)
The Honourable John Ewen Sinclair (from December 30, 1921)
The Honourable James Horace King (from February 3, 1922)
The Honourable Peter Charles Larkin (from March 9, 1922)
The Honourable Edward Mortimer Macdonald (from April 12, 1923)
The Honourable Edward James McMurray (from November 14, 1923)
The Honourable Pierre Joseph Arthur Cardin (from January 30, 1924)
The Honourable Harold Buchanan McGiverin (from September 20, 1924)
The Honourable Frédéric Liguori Béique (from May 20, 1925)
The Honourable Georges Henri Boivin (from September 5, 1925)
The Honourable George Newcombe Gordon (from September 7, 1925)
The Honourable Sir Herbert Meredith Marler (from September 9, 1925)
The Right Honourable Charles Vincent Massey (from September 16, 1925)
The Honourable Walter Edward Foster (from September 26, 1925)
The Honourable Philippe Roy (from February 9, 1926)
The Honourable Charles Avery Dunning (from March 1, 1926)
The Honourable John Campbell Elliott (from March 8, 1926)

Meighen

The Honourable William Anderson Black (from June 29, 1926)
The Honourable James Dew Chaplin (from July 13, 1926)
The Honourable George Burpee Jones (from July 13, 1926)
The Honourable Edmond Baird Ryckman (from July 13, 1926)
The Honourable Donald Sutherland (from July 13, 1926)
The Honourable Raymond Ducharme Morand (from July 13, 1926)
The Honourable John Alexander Macdonald (from July 13, 1926)
The Honourable John Léo Chabot (from July 19, 1926)
The Honourable Eugène Paquet (from August 23, 1926)
The Honourable Guillaume André Fauteux (from August 23, 1926)

King

The Honourable Lucien Cannon (from September 25, 1926)
The Honourable Peter John Veniot (from September 25, 1926)
The Honourable William Daum Euler (from September 25, 1926)
The Honourable Fernand Rinfret (from September 25, 1926)
The Honourable James Malcolm (from September 25, 1926)
The Honourable Robert Forke (from September 25, 1926)
The Honourable Peter Heenan (from September 25, 1926)
The Honourable James Layton Ralston (from October 8, 1926)
His Royal Highness Edward Albert Christian George Andrew Patrick David Prince of Wales (from August 2, 1927)
The Right Honourable Stanley Baldwin (from August 2, 1927)
The Honourable Thomas Ahearn (from January 16, 1928)
The Right Honourable James Ramsay MacDonald (from October 18, 1929)
The Honourable William Frederic Kay (from Kay June 17, 1930)
The Honourable Cyrus Macmillan (from June 17, 1930)
The Right Honourable Ian Alistair Mackenzie (from June 27, 1930)
The Honourable Arthur Charles Hardy (from July 31, 1930)

Bennett

The Honourable Arthur Sauvé (from August 7, 1930)
The Honourable Murray MacLaren (from August 7, 1930)
The Honourable Hugh Alexander Stewart (from August 7, 1930)
The Honourable Charles Hazlitt Cahan (from August 7, 1930)
The Honourable Donald Matheson Sutherland (from August 7, 1930)
The Honourable Alfred Duranleau (from August 7, 1930)
The Honourable Thomas Gerow Murphy (from August 7, 1930)
The Honourable Maurice Dupré (from August 7, 1930)
The Honourable Wesley Ashton Gordon (from August 7, 1930)
The Honourable Robert Weir (from August 8, 1930)
The Honourable Howard Ferguson (from January 14, 1931)
The Honourable William Duncan Herridge (from June 17, 1931)
The Honourable Robert Charles Matthews (from December 6, 1933)
The Honourable Richard Burpee Hanson (from November 17, 1934)
The Honourable Grote Stirling (from November 17, 1934)
The Honourable George Reginald Geary (from August 14, 1935)
The Honourable William Gordon Ernst (from August 14, 1935)
The Honourable James Earl Lawson (from August 14, 1935)
The Honourable Samuel Gobeil (from August 14, 1935)
The Honourable Lucien Henri Gendron (from August 30, 1935)
The Honourable William Earl Rowe (from August 30, 1935)
The Honourable Onésime Gagnon (from August 30, 1935)

King

The Honourable Charles Gavan Power (from October 23, 1935)
The Right Honourable James Lorimer Ilsley (from October 23, 1935)
The Honourable Joseph Enoil Michaud (from October 23, 1935)
The Honourable Norman McLeod Rogers (from October 23, 1935)
The Right Honourable Clarence Decatur Howe (from October 23, 1935)
The Right Honourable James Garfield Gardiner (from November 4, 1935)
The Honourable Norman Alexander McLarty (from January 23, 1939)
The Honourable James Angus MacKinnon (from January 23, 1939)
The Honourable Pierre François Casgrain (from May 2, 1940)
The Honourable William Pate Mulock (from July 8, 1940)
The Honourable Colin William George Gibson (from July 8, 1940)
The Honourable Angus Lewis Macdonald (from July 12, 1940)
The Honourable Leighton Goldie McCarthy (from March 4, 1941)
The Honourable Joseph Thorarinn Thorson (from June 11, 1941)
The Honourable William Ferdinand Alphonse Turgeon (from October 8, 1941)
The Right Honourable Louis Stephen St. Laurent (from December 10, 1941)
The Honourable Humphrey Mitchell (from December 15, 1941)
The Right Honourable Sir Winston S. Churchill (from December 29, 1941)
The Honourable Alphonse Fournier (from October 7, 1942)
The Honourable Ernest Bertrand (from October 7, 1942)
The Honourable Léo Richer Laflèche (from October 7, 1942)
The Honourable Brooke Claxton (from October 13, 1944)
The Honourable Andrew George Latta McNaughton (from November 2, 1944)
The Honourable James Allison Glen (from April 18, 1945)
The Honourable Joseph Jean (from April 18, 1945)
The Honourable Lionel Chevrier (from April 18, 1945)
The Right Honourable Paul Martin Sr. (from April 18, 1945)
The Honourable Douglas Charles Abbott (from April 18, 1945)
The Honourable James Joseph McCann (from April 18, 1945)
The Honourable David L. MacLaren (from April 19, 1945)
The Honourable Thomas Vien (from July 19, 1945)
The Honourable Hedley Francis Gregory Bridges (from August 30, 1945)
The Honourable Wishart McLea Robertson (from September 4, 1945)
The Honourable Milton Fowler Gregg (from September 2, 1947)
The Honourable Robert Wellington Mayhew (from June 11, 1948)
The Right Honourable Lester Bowles Pearson (from September 10, 1948)

See also

List of current members of the Queen's Privy Council for Canada
List of members of the Privy Council for Canada (1867–1911)
List of members of the Privy Council for Canada (1948–1968)
List of members of the Privy Council for Canada (1968–2005)
List of members of the Privy Council for Canada (2006–present)

References

 

1911-1948